Buckley School is an independent, K-9 day school for boys located on the Upper East Side of Manhattan, New York City, United States.

The school has three divisions: Lower School (K-3), Middle School (4-6) and Upper School (7-9), with a student body of approximately 370 pupils and 90 faculty and staff members. The head of school is Gregory J. O’Melia, the sixth head to be appointed since the school's founding in 1913.

Buckley is a member of the National Association of Independent Schools, the New York State Association of Independent Schools and the International Boys’ Schools Coalition (IBSC). Additionally, it is a charter member of the Manhattan Private Middle School League and the Metropolitan Private Middle School Track and Field Association. The school's motto is “Honor et Veritas” (Honor and Truth). Its official seal is a shield.

History
B. Lord Buckley, a professional educator, founded Buckley in 1913 as a boys' elementary school with the aim of offering a classical curriculum. The original school was located above a milliner's shop on Madison Avenue. In 1917, the school moved to a larger building on East 74th Street. In the late 1990s, Buckley purchased a townhouse on E 73rd Street to house the Walsh building, its main school. The 74th Street Hubball building continues to be a part of the school and houses Beginners classrooms and athletic facilities. In 2014 two townhouses were purchased on E 73rd Street to serve as the school's Arts and Sciences building.

Five heads of school have succeeded B. Lord Buckley: Evelyn Adams (1932-1947), James Hubball (1947-1972), C. Brett Boocock (1972-1982), Brian Walsh (1982-2001) and its current head of school, Gregory O’Melia (2001–present).

Sports
Buckley offers a wide range of athletic activities. Cross country, football and soccer are offered in the fall; basketball, gymnastics, strength training and wrestling are offered in the winter; baseball, gymnastics, lacrosse and track compete in the spring.

The Buckley football team has been very successful the past couple seasons, going undefeated in 2018, 2017, 2016 and 2015. The most famous Buckley football game was against the Greenwich School at Randal's Island. Buckley came out victorious.

The Buckley varsity wrestling team competes in the King of the Ring Tournament every year.  In 2012, they won the league championship for the 25th consecutive year. Field Day takes place at the end of the school year on Randall's Island. Boys in every class compete in traditional track races as well as events such as tug of war, sack races, egg relays and an obstacle course.

Notable alumni

Robert L. Belknap, professor of Russian literature at Columbia University and former interim dean of Columbia College
Nicholas Britell, Emmy Award winning and Oscar nominated music composer
Christopher Nixon Cox, businessman, grandson of Richard Nixon
Charles B. Finch, attorney and business executive
S. Parker Gilbert, chairman and President of Morgan Stanley, son of Seymour Parker Gilbert, Assistant Secretary of the Treasury under US Presidents Woodrow Wilson & Warren G. Harding and Ambassador to Germany
James Harder, actor and son of American Businessman & Titanic Survivor Achilles Harder
J. Tomilson Hill, Blackstone Vice Chairman, Lehman Brothers CEO & Billionaire
John V. Lindsay, Mayor of New York and US Congressman
Peter Livanos, shipping tycoon and majority owner of The Aston Martin Automobile Company
Winston Lord,  United States diplomat and leader of non-governmental foreign policy organizations; served as Special Assistant to the National Security Advisor, Director of the State Department Policy Planning Staff, President of the Council on Foreign Relations, Ambassador to China, and Assistant Secretary of State (1993–1997)
Archer Mayor, author
Nick McDonell, author
John McPheters, founder and CEO of Stadium Goods
Justin Muzinich, United States Deputy Secretary of the Treasury
John Negroponte, US Deputy Secretary of State, US Director of National Intelligence, US Ambassador to the United Nations, Ambassador to Iraq, Philippines, Mexico and Honduras
Nicholas Negroponte, MIT professor and founder of MIT Media Lab, co-founder of Wired Magazine
Addison O'Dea, documentary filmmaker
Claiborne Pell, US Senator and Chairman of Senate Foreign Relations Committee, longest serving US Senator from Rhode Island  
Nicholas Platt, diplomat
Sam Posey, retired racing driver, television commentator, artist
Ogden Reid New York Herald Tribune Publisher, Ambassador to Israel under President Eisenhower, and six-term Congressman 
David Rockefeller, Jr., Chairman of Rockefeller Family Foundation, member of Council on Foreign Relations and philanthropist
Michael C. Rockefeller, explorer & son of New York Governor & US Vice President Nelson Rockefeller
Elliott Roosevelt, United States Army Air Forces officer, author and a son of President Franklin D. Roosevelt (1882–1945) and First Lady Eleanor Roosevelt (1884–1962)
Franklin Delano Roosevelt, Jr., American lawyer, politician, and businessman and fifth child of President Franklin Delano Roosevelt and First Lady Eleanor Roosevelt
John Aspinwall Roosevelt, philanthropist and last child of U.S. President Franklin D. Roosevelt, and his wife, Eleanor Roosevelt
William J. "Billy" Ruane Jr., Boston music promoter
Jim Steyer, children's advocate, civil rights attorney, professor, author, and founder of Common Sense Media
Tom Steyer, American billionaire, Forbes 400 member and founder of hedge fund Farallon Capital
Alex Timbers, playwright, director, and producer
Donald Trump Jr., American businessman, and son of US President Donald Trump
Cyrus Vance Jr., New York County District Attorney & son of Cyrus Vance, Secretary of State to US President Jimmy Carter
Oswald Garrison Villard, Jr., Stanford & Harvard Professor of Engineering, inventor, and son of Henry Villard, Thomas Edison's financial backer 
Robert F. Wagner, Jr., Deputy Mayor of the City of New York & Chairman of New York City Board of Education, son of Robert F. Wagner, Jr., mayor of New York City, and grandson of US Senator Robert Ferdinand Wagner
William Woodward Jr., heir to the Hanover National Bank fortune and the Belair Estate, and a leading figure in racing circles
Christopher A. Wray, 8th Director of the Federal Bureau of Investigation
Grant Shelby Hubley Jr., known as Whip Hubley, is an American former actor.

In popular culture
Mad Men character Pete Campbell is portrayed as an alumnus, as well as of Deerfield Academy and Dartmouth College.
The Bonfire of the Vanities character Sherman McCoy is portrayed as an alumnus, as well as of St. Paul's and Yale.
Succession characters Kendall Roy and Stewy Hosseini are portrayed as alumni, as well as of Harvard University.

References

External links

Private K–8 schools in Manhattan
Upper East Side
Boys' schools in New York City